Delphos may refer to:

 Delphos (mythology), the son of Apollo in Greek mythology; Delphi was named for him
 Isle of Delphos, a former name for the island of Delos, mythological birthplace of Apollo

Places in the United States
 Delphos, Iowa
 Delphos, Kansas
 Delphos, New Mexico
 Delphos, Ohio